MX vs. ATV Unleashed is a racing simulation action sports console video game created for PlayStation 2, Xbox, Microsoft Windows and mobile phones. Developed by Rainbow Studios and published by THQ, the video game was released in 2005 in North America and Europe. MX vs. ATV Unleashed is a crossover between THQ's MX trilogy (comprising MX 2002 featuring Ricky Carmichael, MX Superfly and MX Unleashed) and Sony's ATV Offroad Fury series, and it features same console support for two players and online support for eight players. The PC version has a "track editor" feature.

A PlayStation Portable port of Unleashed, titled MX vs. ATV: On the Edge, was released in 2006, and a sequel, MX vs. ATV Untamed was released in late 2007.

PlayStation Portable version
A PlayStation Portable version was later released in 2006 as MX vs. ATV: On the Edge. In the PlayStation Portable version, there are several modes of play covering the entire world of pro ATV and MX racing like Hill climb, FMX, super cross race and others. In this game, players can drive not only ATVs and MX bikes but dune buggies, golf carts, stadium trucks, monster trucks and sand rails. Besides obvious graphical differences and the addition of several new playable areas, the game lacks the ability to fly airplanes unlike in the console edition of the game. The game has been marketed as MX vs. ATV: On the Edge in both magazine articles and in the box art. However, in the game, it is referred to as MX vs. ATV Unleashed: On the Edge.

Reception

MX vs. ATV Unleashed received "generally positive" and "mixed or average" reviews, according to review aggregator Metacritic. PlayStation Illustrated gave the game a score of 66%, calling the game "boring".

References

External links
 
 

2005 video games
Beenox games
Crossover racing games
Monster truck video games
Multiplayer and single-player video games
MX vs. ATV
PlayStation 2 games
PlayStation Portable games
Rainbow Studios games
THQ games
Video games developed in the United States
Windows games
Xbox games